Péter Kabát (born 25 September 1977) is a Hungarian football player.

He can play as a striker or as an offensive midfielder. Kabát earned his first international cap on 15 November 2000 in a 1–0 win to Macedonia.

Club career
He was the top scorer for Vasas Budapest in 2000/01 and in 2002 he won the Bulgarian championship and cup with Levski Sofia. Kabát is the first foreign player to register three assists in the A PFG, a feat he achieved on 6 April 2002, in Levski Sofia's 3:1 win over Slavia Sofia. He also played at Göztepe in the Turkish league in 2001-2002 season and for Austrian side Austria Kärnten.

On 16 December 2010, Kabát netted twice to help his team to a 2:0 win against Italian side U.C. Sampdoria. These were the first ever points earned by the team from Debrecen in the group stages of a UEFA tournament.

In June 2011, Kabát returned to his previous club, Újpest FC.

Honours

Club
 Levski Sofia
A Group (1): 2001–02
Bulgarian Cup (1): 2001–02

 Újpest
Hungarian Cup (1): 2013–14

Individual
Hungarian League Top Goalscorer (1): 2001

References

External links
 Profile - Ujpest
 
 Profile at LevskiSofia.info

1977 births
Living people
Footballers from Budapest
Hungarian footballers
Association football forwards
Hungary youth international footballers
Hungary under-21 international footballers
Hungary international footballers
Budapest Honvéd FC players
Vasas SC players
Göztepe S.K. footballers
PFC Levski Sofia players
Denizlispor footballers
FC Kärnten players
FC Juniors OÖ players
SK Austria Kärnten players
Újpest FC players
Debreceni VSC players
Győri ETO FC players
Nemzeti Bajnokság I players
Süper Lig players
First Professional Football League (Bulgaria) players
Austrian Football Bundesliga players
Hungarian expatriate footballers
Expatriate footballers in Turkey
Expatriate footballers in Bulgaria
Expatriate footballers in Austria
Hungarian expatriate sportspeople in Turkey
Hungarian expatriate sportspeople in Bulgaria
Hungarian expatriate sportspeople in Austria
I'm a Celebrity...Get Me Out of Here! winners